is a female badminton player from Japan.

Tanaka played badminton at the 2004 Summer Olympics, losing to Salakjit Ponsana of Thailand in the round of 32.

Achievements

IBF International 
Women's singles

Link
Site at the Japanese Olympic Committee

1976 births
Living people
Japanese female badminton players
Olympic badminton players of Japan
Badminton players at the 2004 Summer Olympics